The 1992 United States men's Olympic basketball team, nicknamed the "Dream Team", was the first American Olympic team to feature active professional players from the National Basketball Association (NBA). The team has been described by journalists around the world as the greatest sports team ever assembled.

At the 1992 Summer Olympics held in Barcelona, the team defeated its opponents by an average of 44 points en route to the gold medal against Croatia.

The team was collectively inducted into the U.S. Olympic Hall of Fame in 2009, the Naismith Memorial Basketball Hall of Fame in 2010, and the FIBA Hall of Fame in 2017. The Naismith Hall calls the team "the greatest collection of basketball talent on the planet".  In addition to the team induction, 11 players and three coaches have also been inducted individually into the Naismith Memorial Hall of Fame.

Forming the team

Background
Prior to the 1992 Olympics, FIBA rules specifically prevented NBA players from participating in Olympic tournaments, and only amateurs were eligible for the U.S. Olympic teams, which were composed of collegiate and, at times (especially in the 1950s), AAU players. Other countries used their best players from their domestic professional leagues. In the 1988 Summer Olympics, the Americans lost to the USSR and settled for bronze, their worst finish in the history of the tournament. 

In 1989, FIBA voted to change the rule and allow NBA players to participate. The vote was 56–13 in favor of the change; the Amateur Basketball Association of the United States of America (ABAUSA, renamed USA Basketball after the vote) voted against it due to "colleges and high schools that make up most of [ABAUSA's] constituency [opposing] it." The Soviet proposal to limit the national teams to only two NBA players for the first few years was then unanimously rejected.

Selections

USA Basketball asked the NBA to supply players for its 1992 roster; the league was initially unenthusiastic about this idea. In early 1991, Sports Illustrated labeled the forthcoming American roster as the "Dream Team" on the cover of its February 18 issue.

The first ten players for the team were selected on September 21, 1991: Michael Jordan and Scottie Pippen of the Chicago Bulls, John Stockton and Karl Malone of the Utah Jazz, Magic Johnson of the Los Angeles Lakers, Larry Bird of the Boston Celtics, Patrick Ewing of the New York Knicks, Chris Mullin of the Golden State Warriors, David Robinson of the San Antonio Spurs, and Charles Barkley of the Philadelphia 76ers. On May 12, 1992, Clyde Drexler of the Portland Trail Blazers was chosen over Isiah Thomas of the Detroit Pistons for the final professional roster spot. As an acknowledgment to the previous amateur system, the U.S. basketball committee decided to include one collegiate player on the team: Christian Laettner of Duke University was added on May 12, 1992, chosen over Louisiana State University's Shaquille O'Neal.

Most of the players on the team were at or near the peaks of their NBA careers. Bird had back trouble but was selected due to the team's historic nature. Robinson had played with the 1988 Olympic team and was eager to earn a gold medal at Barcelona.

Johnson had retired from the Lakers in November 1991 after testing positive for HIV. His teammates expected Johnson to die from the disease, and he later described his selection for the Olympics as "almost like a life saver", evidence that he could still overcome the illness and live a productive life. The Australian Olympic delegation prominently threatened to boycott the games in protest of Johnson's presence, fearing that he might infect other athletes. Their threats backfired, however, as Johnson received even more public support. Ewing, Jordan, and Mullin had won gold at the 1984 games; Malone had not made the team and saw his non-selection in 1984 as a challenge.

Jordan declined head coach Chuck Daly's suggestion that Jordan serve as the public face of the team, and Bird and Johnson were selected as co-captains. Over the previous 13 NBA seasons leading up to the 1992 Olympics, these three superstars combined had won 10 NBA championships and received seven NBA Finals MVP awards and nine regular-season MVP awards.

Isiah Thomas left off team
There was speculation that Isiah Thomas was not part of the team because Jordan would participate only if Thomas was not on the roster. At the time, it was widely believed that Jordan did not like Thomas because he was seen as the "ring leader" of the Detroit Pistons of the late 1980s and early 1990s; nicknamed the "Bad Boys", the team employed overtly physical tactics against Jordan in the NBA Playoffs. In his 2012 book Dream Team, author Jack McCallum quotes Jordan as saying to Team USA selection committee member Rod Thorn, "Rod, I don’t want to play if Isiah Thomas is on the team". In 2020, Thorn and Jordan denied directly mentioning Thomas's name in discussions. According to Jordan in the documentary series The Last Dance, he asked Thorn, "Who’s all playing?" to which Thorn responded, "The guy you’re thinking about is not going to be playing."

After the selection of the first ten members of the team, Johnson released an official statement in support of Thomas, but years later it was discovered that his support was less than enthusiastic. In the book When the Game Was Ours, Johnson said, "Isiah killed his own chances when it came to the Olympics. Nobody on that team wanted to play with him."

Laettner selection over O'Neal

The selection committee considered several college players including Harold Miner, Jimmy Jackson, and Alonzo Mourning in addition to Shaquille O'Neal and Christian Laettner. O'Neal was the number-one pick in the 1992 NBA draft, but Laettner's Duke Blue Devils teams won consecutive National Championships in 1991 and 1992. Coached by Mike Krzyzewski ("Coach K") - who also was a first-time assistant coach for the Olympic program, Laettner was the Naismith College Player of the Year and scored the game-winning basket as time expired in the 1992 NCAA Eastern Regional final. Although O'Neal was a two-time Consensus NCAA First Team All-American in 1991 and 1992, his team lost in the second round of the 1992 NCAA men's tournament. Laettner's college success and coach's endorsement ultimately secured his position on the team.

Success on the court

Early scrimmages
To help the team prepare for the Olympics, a squad of the best NCAA college players was formed to scrimmage them. USA Basketball selected players whose style of play, it hoped, would resemble that of the Europeans the Dream Team would face. Members included the penetrating guard Bobby Hurley, all-around players Grant Hill and Penny Hardaway, outside shooter Allan Houston, and the tough Chris Webber and Eric Montross. Hill and Hardaway would play for the 1996 national team, and Houston on the 2000 team.

In late June, the Dream Team first met together in La Jolla, California, astounding and intimidating the collegians who watched them practice. However, on June 24, the Dream Team lost to the NCAA team, 62–54, after underestimating the opposition. Daly intentionally limited Jordan's playing time and made non-optimal substitutions; assistant coach Mike Krzyzewski later said that the head coach "threw the game" to teach the NBA players that they could be beaten. The teams played again the following day, with the Olympians winning decisively in the rematch. Some of the college players visited Jordan's hotel room afterward and asked their hero for his personal items as souvenirs.

Tournament of the Americas
The Dream Team made its international debut on June 28 at the Tournament of the Americas, an Olympic qualifying event in Portland, Oregon. The team defeated Cuba 136–57, prompting Cuban coach Miguel Calderón Gómez to say, "You can't cover the sun with your finger." Marv Albert, who announced the game, recalled that "it was as if [the Americans] were playing a high school team, or grade school team. They were so overwhelming ... a blowout after blowout." The Cubans were the first of many opponents who were more interested in taking photos with the Americans than playing them. The next five games were also easy victories for Team USA, which ended the tournament on July 5 with a 127–80 victory over Venezuela in the championship game to win the tournament and be one of four Americas squads to qualify for the Olympics.

Olympics

The team trained for the Olympics in Monaco for six days, practicing two hours a day and playing exhibition games against other national teams. During their time away from the court, the squad spent time enjoying the nude beaches, Monte Carlo's casinos, and dining with royalty. There was no curfew; as Daly stated, "I'm not putting in a curfew because I'd have to adhere to it, and Jimmy'z [a noted Monte Carlo nightclub] doesn't open until midnight."

For one scrimmage, the group divided into two teams: Blue (led by Johnson, with Barkley, Robinson, Mullin, and Laettner) and White (led by Jordan, with Malone, Ewing, Pippen, and Bird). Drexler and Stockton did not play because of injuries. Daly told the teams to play "All you got now. All you got." White won, 40 to 36, in what Jordan recalled as "the best game I was ever in" and Sports Illustrated later called "the Greatest Game Nobody Ever Saw".

Because of the team's unique celebrity, the Dream Team did not stay in the Olympic Village due to security concerns. The Olympic Village had only four guards at the gate when the team arrived to pick up their credentials; one of the guards, upon seeing the Dream Team, grabbed his camera and his child while the team members were mobbed by other Olympic athletes. Daly also stated that the beds in the Village were a problem, as two of his athletes were over seven feet tall and he considered comfort a priority to keep the team rested.

As a result, the team stayed at Barcelona's Hotel Ambassador, where USA Basketball occupied 80 of the hotel's 98 rooms. Fans were not allowed to enter the lobby, but did gather outside the hotel, hoping to see their favorite players. "It was like Elvis and the Beatles put together," Daly said. Opposing basketball players and athletes from other sports often asked to have photographs taken with the players.

In an interview years later, Charles Barkley recounted that "we got death threats". Despite that assertion, Barkley walked around the city alone. When asked where his bodyguards were, he held up his fists and answered, "This is my security."

Jordan was the only player who studied the opposition, carefully watching game tapes. He and the other Americans enjoyed the opportunity to get to know each other in a casual setting, often playing cards all night and, for Jordan, playing several rounds of golf daily with little rest.

Opposing teams were nonetheless overwhelmed by the talent of the American roster, losing by an average of 43.8 points per game.  This was the second largest Olympic Games point differential, surpassed only by the 53.5 point per game margin achieved by the 1956 US Men's Basketball Team. The Dream Team was the first to score more than 100 points in every game. Its 117.3 average was more than 15 points more than the 1960 US team. Johnson later recalled, "I look to my right, there's Michael Jordan ... I look to my left, there's Charles Barkley or Larry Bird ... I didn't know who to throw the ball to!"

In a press conference before the team's first Olympic game against Angola, Barkley famously quipped "I don't know anything about Angola. But Angola's in trouble." Herlander Coimbra of Angola recalled that "those guys were on another level—a galaxy far, far away". During the game, Barkley elbowed Coimbra in the chest and was unapologetic after the game, claiming he was hit first. Barkley was called for an intentional foul on the play. Coimbra's resulting free throw was the only point scored by Angola during a 46–1 run by the US.

Although this incident had no bearing on the final result (a 116–48 USA win), at the time there was a concern about the image of America to the rest of the world. After the game, Jordan said, "There just wasn't any place for it. We were dominating the game. It created mixed feelings, it caused a mixed reaction about the U.S. There's already some negative feelings about us." Even though this was the only incident of the game, it changed the narrative; instead of the Americans being viewed as a highly skilled team beating an underdog, some viewed them as bullies.

Daly started Jordan in every game, and Johnson started in five of the six games he played, missing two games because of knee problems. Pippen, Bird, Mullin, Robinson, Ewing, Malone, and Barkley rotated in the other starting spots. Barkley was the Dream Team's leading scorer during the Olympics, averaging 18.0 points per game, although the player selection committee had been unsure of his inclusion, worried that he would not represent the United States well.

The closest of the eight matches was Team USA's 117–85 victory over Croatia in the gold medal game. Croatia, participating as an independent nation in the Olympics for the first time since its separation from the former Yugoslavia, briefly led the Dream Team by a score of 25–23 in the first half. By the end of the game, Team USA had pulled away and Stockton agreed to a Croatian player's plea not to shoot. Pippen and Jordan aggressively sought the opportunity to guard Toni Kukoč of Croatia. He had just signed a contract with the Bulls for more money than Pippen, who believed that the team's negotiation with the Croatian had delayed his own contract. Tired of hearing about Kukoč's talent, Pippen and Jordan agreed to, as Jordan later said, "not ... let this guy do anything against us." McCallum described the two Bulls as "rabid dogs" against Kukoč.  Croatia had lost to the Dream Team 103–70 in their first game.  The only team besides Croatia to hold the margin under 40 points was Puerto Rico, which lost 115–77 in the quarterfinals.

Legacy

Sports Illustrated later stated that the Dream Team was "arguably the most dominant squad ever assembled in any sport" and compared it to "Johnny Cash at Folsom Prison, the Allman Brothers at the Fillmore East, Santana at Woodstock." In 2009, the team was elected to the U.S. Olympic & Paralympic Hall of Fame. The following year, the team was elected to the Naismith Memorial Basketball Hall of Fame.

Barkley later said, "I don't think there's anything better to representing your country. I don't think anything in my life can come close to that." Bird called the medal ceremony and the playing of "The Star-Spangled Banner" "the ultimate experience." Johnson said, "The 92 Dream Team was the greatest moment of my life in terms of basketball, bar none." Jordan said that the biggest benefit for him from the Olympics was that he learned more about his teammates' weaknesses. He later defeated Barkley, Malone, and Stockton in three NBA finals. As of 2014, 11 of the 12 players on the roster (all except Laettner) and three of the four coaches (all except Carlesimo) have been elected to the Hall of Fame as individuals.

Global interest in basketball soared due to the Dream Team. In one game, an opposing player guarding Magic Johnson was seen frantically waving to a camera-wielding teammate on the bench, signaling to make sure he got a picture of them together. Daly said of the opposing teams "They'll go home and for the rest of their lives be able to tell their kids, 'I played against Michael Jordan and Magic Johnson and Larry Bird.' And the more they play against our best players, the more confident they're going to get".

International Olympic Committee head Juan Antonio Samaranch stated that "the most important aspect of the [Barcelona] Games has been the resounding success of the basketball tournament, as we've witnessed the best basketball in the world." Subsequently, the number of international players in the NBA rose. On opening day of the 1991–92 season, NBA rosters included 23 international players from 18 countries. At the start of the 2011–12 season, there were 74 players from 35 countries. Many international players credited the Dream Team as their inspiration to take up basketball.

Kobe Bryant and LeBron James said they believed their 2012 Olympic team would win against the Dream Team. Bryant said, "[T]hey were a lot older, at kind of the end of their careers. We have just a bunch of young racehorses, guys that are eager to compete." Barkley said that he "just started laughing" upon hearing Bryant's comment and that the Dream Team would win by double digits. Jordan added, "For [Bryant] to compare those two teams is not one of the smarter things he ever could have done... Remember now, they learned from us. We didn't learn from them." Bird joked, "They probably could. I haven't played in 20 years and we're all old now."

The team was elected to the FIBA Hall of Fame in 2017.

Roster

Tournament of the Americas results

The team was undefeated, with their closest margin of victory being 38 points over Puerto Rico.

Tournament statistics

Olympics results
The team was again undefeated, with their closest outing being the 32-point victory over Croatia for the gold medal.

Olympic statistics

See also

United States men's national basketball team
Basketball at the 1992 Summer Olympics
Team USA Basketball (video game)

Notes

References

External links
Olympics statistics at FIBA.com
1992 Dream Team: Classic Photos 

United States at the Olympic men's basketball tournament
United States
Olympics
FIBA Hall of Fame inductees
Naismith Memorial Basketball Hall of Fame inductees